Palmerah is a subdistrict of West Jakarta, Indonesia. The Subdistrict is roughly bounded by Jakarta-Merak Tollway to the north, Batusari - Rawa Belong Road to the west, Palmerah Barat - Palmerah Utara Road to the south, and Aipda K. Sasuit Tubun Road - Western Flood Canal to the east.

Jalan Letnan Jenderal S Parman and Jakarta Inner Ring Road Tollway, one of Jakarta's main artery, crosses the center of Palmerah Subdistrict.

Kelurahan (Administrative Villages)
Palmerah is divided into six Kelurahan (Administrative Villages)
Slipi - area code 11410 
Kota Bambu Utara - area code 11420 
Kota Bambu Selatan - area code 11420
Jatipulo - area code 11430 
Palmerah - area code 11480 
Kemanggisan - area code 11480

Tourist attractions
Textile Museum
Kompas Tower
Pasar Palmerah

References

Districts of Jakarta
West Jakarta